Season 1884–85 was the 9th season in which Hibernian competed at a Scottish national level, entering the Scottish Cup for the 8th time.

Overview 

Hibs reached the semi-final of the Scottish Cup, losing 2–1 to the Renton.

Results 

All results are written with Hibs' score first.

Scottish Cup

See also
List of Hibernian F.C. seasons

Notes

External links 
 Results For Season 1884/1885 in All Competitions, www.ihibs.co.uk

Hibernian F.C. seasons
Hibernian